Megachile pauliani is a species of bee in the family Megachilidae. It was described by Benoist in 1950.

References

Pauliani
Insects described in 1950